Alayaya is a village in Sri Lanka. It is a suburb of Matale, located within Matale District, Central Province.

Demographics

See also
List of towns in Central Province, Sri Lanka

References

External links

Populated places in Matale District